White Owl Social Club is a bar and restaurant in southeast Portland, Oregon's Buckman neighborhood, in the United States.

History
White Owl was established in January 2013. Ownership changed from Matthew Jacobson and Michael McKennedy (who also own Sizzle Pie) to AJ Fosik, Jason Radich, and Matthew Relkin in September 2015.

In 2016, White Owl was the most frequent Lyft bar destination in Portland. In 2018, the business permanently removed beef and lamb from its menu for environmental purposes.

In 2019, the bar apologized and fired two security guards for removing a transgender guest.

Reception
White Owl Social Club was a runner-up in the "Best Patio" category of Willamette Week "Best of Portland Readers' Poll 2020".

References

External links

 

2013 establishments in Oregon
Bars (establishments)
Buckman, Portland, Oregon
Restaurants established in 2013
Restaurants in Portland, Oregon
Southeast Portland, Oregon